The 1956 LPGA Championship was the second LPGA Championship, held June 21–24 at Forest Lake Country Club in Bloomfield Hills, Michigan, a suburb northwest of Detroit.

Marlene Hagge, age 22, won her only major title in a sudden death playoff over runner-up Patty Berg, who missed a bogey putt on the first playoff hole to stay alive. The two were co-leaders after 54 holes and both shot 76 (+1) in the final round to tie at 291 (−9), five strokes ahead of third-place finisher Betty Jameson. Defending champion Beverly Hanson finished ten strokes back, tied for sixth.

The course hosted its second major two years later, the U.S. Women's Open in 1958.

Past champion in the field

Source:

Final leaderboard
Sunday, June 24, 1956

Source:

Playoff

Source:

References

External links
Forest Lake Country Club

Women's PGA Championship
Golf in Michigan
Sports competitions in Detroit
LPGA Championship
LPGA Championship
LPGA Championship
LPGA Championship
Women's sports in Michigan
Bloomfield Hills, Michigan